Lloyd Brown (October 7, 1901 – March 29, 2007) was one of the last surviving American veterans of the First World War and also the last member of the United States Navy to have signed up before the German armistice. He was discharged in 1919, but reenlisted in 1921, and served as a Musician 2nd Class. He was discharged in 1925. After his service, he worked at a Washington, D.C. firefighter company covering the White House and foreign embassies.

His age of 105 is subject to some dispute, as he may have been 'only' 104 based on the 1910 Census.

References

External links
His obituary at USAToday
The New York Times obit
Lloyd Brown Collection (AFC/2001/001/31443), Veterans History Project, American Folklife Center, Library of Congress

1900s births
2007 deaths
American centenarians
Men centenarians
United States Navy personnel of World War I
People from St. Mary's County, Maryland
People from Ozark County, Missouri
Military personnel from Missouri
United States Navy non-commissioned officers